Guatemala is one of the most dangerous countries for journalists and media workers in Latin America. At least 342 journalists were murdered and 126 were disappeared or illegally arrested during the Guatemalan Civil War (1960–1996). On average, that would calculate to one attack each month for 36 years. When fighting broke out between the leftist guerrilla movements and the right-wing government, journalism became a dangerous profession in the country. Hundreds of media workers were beaten, imprisoned, kidnapped, or even killed for writing about corruption, repression, organized crime, and human right violations committed by the regime. As the intensity of the civil war increased in the 1970s, Guatemalan journalism polarized and journalists became involved in politics. If a citizen wanted to report a crime, they went to the press, not to law enforcement; people who wanted to voice their political opposition sent their work for publication to newspapers, not to the Guatemalan government. By 1985, when Guatemala readopted its constitutional rule, press freedom began to improve. When a peace treaty was signed in 1996, the atmosphere improved for journalists in Guatemala and the killings of media workers dropped significantly. However, attacks against the press and targeted killings continued under the form of organized crime.

The end of the civil war made the Guatemalan press free in several aspects; newspapers began to publish articles about government corruption, a topic that was frequently avoided during the war-time era, in increasing numbers. Despite these improvements, journalists in Guatemala learned to adopt a culture of self-censorship that dates back to the civil war. Negative attitudes from the government towards the Guatemalan press continue to exist, and the press lacks the economic independence to break away from the government and its advertisements and become fully autonomous. Most of the media outlets in the country are centered in Guatemala City, the capital. Journalists who work in the capital have better working conditions and are better protected from attacks than those living in the provinces, where they are easily pressured by local officials for their direct reporting. Since the mid-2000s, drug-related violence and the presence of Mexican organized crime, in particular of Los Zetas, has increased the number of homicides in Guatemala and attacks against the press.

During the Guatemalan Civil War

After the Guatemalan Civil War

See also 

 List of journalists killed in Honduras
 List of journalists killed in Mexico
 List of journalists killed in Venezuela

Sources

References

Bibliography

External links
Attacks on the Press: Guatemala (2011), by Committee to Protect Journalists
Journalists killed in Guatemala since 1992, by Committee to Protect Journalists

 List
Guatemala